Bazoft District is in Kuhrang County, Chaharmahal and Bakhtiari province, Iran. At the 2006 census, its population was 14,270 in 2,459 households. The following census in 2011 counted 12,185 people in 2,459 households. At the latest census in 2016, the district had 14,742 inhabitants living in 3,478 households. The population is mainly composed of Bakhtiari Lors from the Haft Lang tribes.

Geography 

In the heart of the Zagros mountains, in the foothills of the Zardkuh mountain range, the Bazoft district is located about 180km west of Shahrekord and 200km east of Masjed Soleyman on the Shahrekord-Masjed Soleyman road. The Bazoft river, located near the Zardkuh mountains, is one of the main affluents of the Karun river.

Gallery

References 

Kuhrang County

Districts of Chaharmahal and Bakhtiari Province

Populated places in Chaharmahal and Bakhtiari Province

Populated places in Kuhrang County